{{DISPLAYTITLE:C11H16O4}}
The molecular formula C11H16O4 (molar mass: 212.24 g/mol) may refer to:

 3,9-Diethylidene-2,4,8,10-tetraoxaspiro(5.5)undecane
 3,9-Divinyl-2,4,8,10-tetraoxaspiro(5.5)undecane
 Methylenolactocin